Spufford is a surname. Notable people with the surname include:

Francis Spufford (born 1964), English author and teacher of writing
Margaret Spufford (1935–2014), British historian and academic
Peter Spufford (1934–2017), British historian and academic